Xylota bicolor , (Loew, 1864), the  Eastern Orange-tailed Leafwalker , is a rare species of syrphid fly observed across the eastern half of North America. Syrphid flies are also known as Hover Flies or Flower Flies because the adults are frequently found hovering around flowers from which they feed on nectar and pollen.

Distribution
Canada, United States.

References

Eristalinae
Insects described in 1864
Diptera of North America
Hoverflies of North America
Taxa named by Hermann Loew